NordBalt (also formerly known as SwedLit) is a submarine power cable between Klaipėda in Lithuania and Nybro in Sweden.  The purpose of the cable is to facilitate the trading of power between the Baltic and Nordic electricity markets, and to increase the supply and energy security in both markets.

History
The project was originally suggested in 2004. Original project Swindlit  was aimed at construction of the wind farm in the Baltic Sea and ensuring the electricity transmission to Sweden and Lithuania. The participants of this project were interested also in Kruonis Pumped Storage Plant as an accumulator of variable wind energy.

In August 2006, the Lithuanian and Swedish transmission grid operators Lietuvos Energija and Svenska kraftnät agreed to launch a feasibility study of a possible interconnector. In February 2007, Lietuvos Energija and Svenska Kraftnät signed an agreement with Swedish consulting company SWECO International on preparation of feasibility study. The study was completed in March 2008 with positive conclusions for the implementation of the project.

On 9 July 2009, Lietuvos Energija, Latvenergo and Svenska Kraftnät signed a memorandum of understanding on the NordBalt project. Invitation for pre-qualification for NordBalt converters' and cable procurement was launched in December 2009. The sea bottom survey was conducted by Marin Mätteknik by 13 December 2009. On 17 December 2010, Litgrid, a newly established transmission system operator of Lithuania who took the project over from Lietuvos Energija, and Svenska kraftnät, signed a €270 million contract with ABB according to which ABB manufactured the cable. According to another contract, signed on 20 December 2010, ABB supplied two converter stations.

In March 2013 the government of Lithuania approved construction plans for the coastal area. On 18 April 2013 the Swedish government gave its final approval of the construction of a power cable. Cable laying started on 11 April 2014. It was laid by using C/S Lewek Connector. The cable laying was disrupted several times by the Russian Navy within the Exclusive Economic Zone of Lithuania causing the Lithuanian prime minister to summon the Russian ambassador and protest against Russia's violation of the United Nations' Convention on the Law of the Sea (UNCLOS). On 9 June 2015, the cable laying works were completed.

The cable was officially inaugurated on 14 December 2015. However, due to fire near the Nybro substation, test transmission with a capacity of 30 MW started only on 1 February 2016. On 17 February 2016, electricity transmitted via Nordbalt was traded first time at Nord Pool Spot.   the interconnector is in a test phase.

Technical features
The interconnector uses high-voltage direct current (HVDC). Its maximum capacity is 700 MW with a ramping restriction of 600 MW,
where the 700 MW capacity corresponds to an annual transmission capacity of 6.1 TWh.

Economy
The interconnector cost €580 million, of which the submarine cable cost €270 million.  €175 million was paid by the European Commission.

It connects the Nord Pool Spot bidding areas southern Sweden (SE4) and Lithuania (LT).

See also
 Energy in Lithuania
 Electricity sector in Sweden
 Baltic Cable, cable between Germany and Sweden
 Konti-Skan, cable between Denmark and Sweden
 Estlink, cable between Estonia and Finland
 Fenno-Skan, cable between Finland and Sweden
 LitPol Link, cable between Lithuania and Poland
 Harmony Link, subsea cable between Lithuania and Poland
 SwePol, cable between Poland and Sweden

References

External links
 Svenska kraftnät project page
 Litgrid

Electrical interconnectors to and from the Baltic grid
Electrical interconnectors to and from the Nordic grid
Submarine power cables
HVDC transmission lines
Electric power infrastructure in Sweden
Electric power transmission systems in Lithuania
Connections across the Baltic Sea
Lithuania–Sweden relations
2015 establishments in Lithuania
2015 establishments in Sweden
Energy infrastructure completed in 2015